Franklinia is a monotypic genus in the tea family, Theaceae. The sole species in this genus is a flowering tree, Franklinia alatamaha,  commonly called the Franklin tree, and native to the Altamaha River valley in Georgia in the southeastern United States. It has been extinct in the wild since the early 19th century, but survives as a cultivated ornamental tree.

In the past, some botanists have included Franklinia within the related genus Gordonia. The southeastern North American species Gordonia lasianthus differs in having evergreen foliage, flowers with longer stems, winged seeds, and conical seed capsules. (Franklinia was often known as Gordonia pubescens until the middle of the 20th century.)

Franklinia is now thought to be closer in relation to the Asian genus Schima. Recent DNA studies and examinations of floral ontogeny in the Theaceae place Franklinia together with Gordonia and Schima in a subtribe. Hybrid crosses have been produced between Franklinia alatamaha and Gordonia lasianthus, and between Franklinia alatamaha and Schima argentea.

Description
It is prized for its fragrant white flowers, similar to single white Camellia blossoms; the smell may remind some of orange blossoms or honeysuckle. The tree has a symmetrical, somewhat pyramidal shape, often with different individuals of the species forming almost identical crowns. It frequently suckers and can form several vertical trunks close to ground level. The bark is gray with vertical white striations and has a ridged texture. Although difficult to transplant, once established, F. alatamaha can live a century or more.

The seed capsules require 12–14 months to mature. Unlike almost all angiosperms, Franklinia alatamaha exhibits zygotic dormancy. It pollinates in late summer or early autumn, is then dormant over winter, and only sets fruit during the subsequent summer. Female gametophytes are mature prior to pollination, with double fertilization occurring soon after pollination. The zygote becomes dormant immediately after fertilization with delay of development until the following summer. Initial development of endosperm occurs for up to 3 months after fertilization but comes to a standstill at winter's onset. With onset of the following summer, embryogenesis begins and endosperm development restarts. This overwinter zygotic dormancy is extremely rare among temperate angiosperms. When ripe the pentavalved spherical capsules split above and below in a unique manner.

History

"No tree which ornaments our gardens has a more romantic history," begins a lengthy 1933 article published in The Pennsylvania Magazine of History and Biography. The history of Franklinia'''s discovery in coastal Georgia, followed by disappearance in the wild, and saved only by its ability to grow, flower, and seed in the Philadelphia garden of its initial collector entail the main thread of the unusual botanical history.

Philadelphia botanists John and William Bartram first observed the tree growing along the Altamaha River near Fort Barrington in the British colony of Georgia in October 1765. John Bartram recorded "severall very curious shrubs" in his journal entry for October 1, 1765. William Bartram returned several times to the same location on the Altamaha during a collecting trip to the American South, funded by Dr. John Fothergill of London. William Bartram collected F. alatamaha seeds during this extended trip to the South from 1773 through 1776, a journey described in his book Bartram's Travels published in Philadelphia in 1791. William Bartram brought seed back to Philadelphia in 1777 at which time William reported to his father that he had relocated the plant, but this time had been able to retrieve its seeds although it was not until after John's death (1777) that he was able to achieve flowering plants (1781). After several years of study, William Bartram assigned the "rare and elegant flowering shrub" to a new genus Franklinia, named in honor of his father's great friend Benjamin Franklin. The new plant name, Franklinia alatamaha, was first published by a Bartram cousin, Humphry Marshall, in 1785 in his catalogue of North American trees and shrubs entitled Arbustrum Americanum. (Marshall 1785: 48–50; Fry 2001).

William Bartram was the first to report the extremely limited distribution of Franklinia. (W. Bartram 1791: 468). After returning to Georgia after the American Revolution, Bartram was unable to find the trees.

The tree was last verified in the wild in 1803 by the English plant collector John Lyon (although there are hints it may have been present into at least the 1840s). The cause of its extinction in the wild is not known, but has been attributed to a number of causes including fire, flood, overcollection by plant collectors, and fungal disease introduced with the cultivation of cotton plants.

All the Franklin trees known to exist today are descended from seed collected by William Bartram and propagated at Bartram's Garden in Philadelphia. It has now been cultivated in over 1000 sites worldwide including botanical gardens, private homes, parks, and cemeteries. It is suggested that more than one tree was sampled by Bartram during his original collection in Georgia and the diversity was maintained over the years. To mark the 300th anniversary of John Bartram's birth in 1998, Bartram's Garden launched a project to locate as many Franklinia trees as possible.

Status as a glacial relict

There have been efforts to reintroduce the species to its native habitat. Twenty-four individuals were planted between 2002 and 2003 in the Altamaha Wildlife Management Area; however, they were unsuccessful. The idea of reintroduction was long controversial for some plant enthusiasts who believed wild populations may still exist. The lack of success in returning an extinct-in-the-wild plant to its formerly native range is not unexpected for those aware of Franklinia's status as a glacial relict.

In eastern North America, lowland glacial refuges along the Atlantic and Gulf Coasts host endemic plants — some of which are rare, even endangered, and others entail the most southerly disjunct populations of plants that commonly appear only hundreds of miles to the north. Major rivers draining southward from the Appalachian Mountains are associated with a gradation of paleoendemic tree species. These range from the extinct Critchfield spruce near the outlet of the Mississippi River, to extinct-in-the-wild Franklinia along the Altamaha River, to the critically endangered Florida torreya and Florida yew at the downstream end of the Chattahoochee River system. (See illustration at right.)

Cultivation
The Franklin tree has a reputation among gardeners for being difficult to cultivate, especially in urban environments. It prefers sandy, high-acid soil, and does not tolerate compacted clay soil, excessive moisture, or any disturbance to its roots. The Franklin tree has no known pests, but it is subject to root-rot and crown-rot caused by Phytophthora cinnamomi and does not endure drought well. It is commercially available for garden cultivation.

It is one of two species of trees in the tea family that only exists in cultivation, the other being Camellia amplexicaulis.

Gallery

References

 Owens, Simon J., and Martyn Rix. "595. FRANKLINIA ALATAMAHA: Theaceae." Curtis's Botanical Magazine (1995), vol. 24, no. 3, BLACKWELL PUBLISHING, 2007, pp. 186–89, .
 Bartram, William. 1791. Travels Through North & South Carolina, Georgia, East & West Florida,…. James & Johnson: Philadelphia.
 Fry, Joel T. 2000. "Franklinia alatamaha, A History of that '‘Very Curious' Shrub, Part 1: Discovery and Naming of the Franklinia", Bartram Broadside, (Spring), p. 1-24.
 Marshall, Humphry. 1785. Arbustrum Americanum. The American Grove, or an Alphabetical Catalogue of Forest Trees and Shrubs, Natives of the American United States, Arranged According to the Linnaean System…, Joseph Cruikshank: Philadelphia.

External links
USDA Plants Profile for Franklinia alatamaha (Franklin tree)
Bartram's Garden: Franklinia
Treetrail.net: Franklinia Article and Photos
entry in New Georgia Encyclopedia
Del Tredici, Peter. "Against All Odds: Growing Franklinia in Boston." Arnoldia 63 (4) (2005).
Wood, Carroll E.. "Some Cultivated Relatives of the Camellia." Arnoldia'' 17 (1-2) (1957).

Theaceae
Endemic flora of the United States
Endemic flora of Georgia (U.S. state)
Trees of the Southeastern United States
Plants extinct in the wild
Monotypic Ericales genera
Benjamin Franklin